Viudas e hijos del Rock and Roll is a 2014 Argentine telenovela, starred by Damián De Santo and Paola Barrientos. It includes several references to the Argentine Rock of the 1990s.

The show ended on May 13, 2015.

Plot
Diego Lamas and Miranda Betini were two rockers who met in Villa Gesell in 1992. Miranda was the daughter of Roby, a famous radio host, but concealed that information from Diego. They had a brief romance, and arranged to reunite in their native Buenos Aires, next to the Obelisco, the next month. Sandra, Miranda's best friend, started a romance with Roby, so she rejected them both. Diego had a car accident and could not meet Miranda at the agreed time, so she broke with him and with the whole rock and roll lifestyle.

The ellipsis jumps to the modern day, Miranda is married to Segundo, and Diego is about to marry Susana. Roby dies, and Diego briefly sees Miranda at his funeral, which was broadcast on TV, and is reunited with her. Miranda and Sandra met Vera as well, another daughter of Roby, who was born out of wedlock. As widow and daughters of Roby, Sandra, Miranda and Vera share each a fourth part of the shares of the radio, alongside Roby's assistant, Pipo. Vera convinces the others to give a radio program to Diego and his friend Rama.

Diego rejects Susana in their wedding and slowly starts a romance with Miranda. Both of their mothers (Titi and Gabriela, respectively) became friends and try to influence them to pursuit it. Segundo is a closeted gay, who develops a crush on his petisero Tony. Miranda and Segundo break up in good terms, and she also helps him to discover that his true mother is María Esther, a former maid of the Arostegui raped by Emilio. Sandra eventually amends her relation with Miranda, and gets pregnant from Rama. Rama, however, stays with Vera. With the exception of Miranda and Segundo, who had their own successful jobs, the Arostegui lost all their money and their mansion, and must move to a small apartment. The last episode featured the gay wedding of Segundo and Tony.

Production
The filming started in May 2014.

Cast
Viudas e hijos del Rock and Roll is the first work of Paola Barrientos as a lead actress in television. She had a long career in theater plays, and her character in Graduados got a lot of praise. Still, she clarified that both characters are different: her character in Graduados was formal, and her character in "Viudas..." is a rebel rocker. She accepted to work in the telenovela because she had a good relation with the other actors of the cast.

Griselda Siciliani worked for Telefe for the first time. Although she worked several years at the competitor channel El Trece, her husband Adrián Suar produces telenovelas at that channel, and is scheduled to appear in cameos in Guapas, Siciliani clarified that they had no conflictive views over that. Her work is limited to 18 episodes, as she had worked a full year in Farsantes and prefers to stay more time with her daughter.

Music
The telenovela uses several references to the 1990s Argentine Rock, and uses the music both for character building and the plots. The telenovela is also set in a fictional radio. The first episodes featured as well other things from the 1990s, such as the "rolinga" urban tribe, the boom of radio stations airing rock, the popularity of Villa Gesell among the young people, and the creation of mixtapes in cassettes. The starting point of the telenovela is the death of Roby, a character played by Lalo Mir, which is described as an icon of Argentine rock.

Reception
The first episode was aired on August 18, with 24,3 rating points. It had the highest rating of the prime time on that day, over Showmatch. The public praised the similarities with the telenovela Graduados, aired in 2012, both in the initial plot and the focus on nostalgia. "Graduados 2" became a trending topic in Twitter that night.

Later on, Viudas... did not achieve the expected ratings, and had a lower success than the re-run of the Turkish Binbir Gece (translated as "Las mil y una noches"). The new time slots and the 80 guest stars did not help it to recover the initial ratings. It ended after 10 months, without living up to expectations.

Awards
Viudas... received seven nominations for the 45th Martín Fierro Awards: best daily fiction, lead actor of daily fiction (Damián de Santo and Juan Minujin), lead actress of daily fiction (Paola Barrientos), best new actor (Dario Barassi), best writers and best music theme. Sebastián Ortega and Pablo Culell were surprised by the absence of Verónica Llinás and Luis Machín, and did not attend the ceremony.

Cast
 Damián De Santo as Diego Lamas
 Paola Barrientos as Miranda Bettini de Arostegui
 Celeste Cid as Vera Santoro / Vera Bettini
 Julieta Ortega as Sandra Cuevas
 Juan Minujín as Segundo "Second" Arostegui
 Mex Urtizberea as Pipo Roch
 Fernán Mirás as Ramiro "Rama" Ferrer
 Ludovico Di Santo as Ignacio "Nacho" Arostegui
 Luis Machín as Luis Emilio Arostegui III
 Verónica Llinás as Inés Murray Tedin Puch de Arostegui
 Violeta Urtizberea as Lourdes Sánchez Elías de Arostegui
 Darío Lopilato as Agustín "El Piojo" Pulido
 Nicolás Francella as Federico Ventura / Federico Roch
 Lalo Mir as Roby Bettini / Juan Carlos Bettini
 Griselda Siciliani as Susana "Susy" Bartolotti
 Hugo Arana as Amílcar Bartolotti
 Daniel Aráoz as Raúl Persa
 Jorgelina Aruzzi as Vivian Acosta
 Cecilia Roth as Ingrid Santoro Ardanaz
 Florencia Peña as Denise Saravia
 Andy Kusnetzoff as Mariano Letterman
 Daniela Herrero as Paula Peñalba
 Chino Darín as Franco Pilares / Franco Bettini
 Eva De Dominici as Mirta "La Pioja" Pulido
 Benjamín Alfonso as Facundo
 Luis Margani as Remigio
 Julieta Cardinali as Lola
 Henny Trayles as Ruth
 Catherine Fulop as Miriam
 María Leal as Gabriela "Gaby" Bianchi
 Eliseo Barrionuevo as Bautista Emilio Arostegui
 Agustina Prinsich as María de la Paz Alcántara Echagüe
 Arian Barbieri as Blas Arostegui
 Byron Barbieri as Lautaro Arostegui
 Antonio Birabent as Bruno Viale
 Marcelo Mazzarello as Estanislao "El Polaco" Karlovich
 Georgina Barbarossa as Beatriz "Tití" Cancela
 Maju Lozano as Mariana Fasano
 Juan Sorini as Antonio "Tony" Emmanuel Gilberto Soilo
 Natalia Figueiras as Alina Mussi
 Paula Baldini as Estela Rovner
 Iride Mockert as Iaia López
 Joe Seitun as Micky Viriloni
 Darío Barassi as Pedro Gatto
 Sheila González as Mayra Poli
 Humberto Tortonese as Paco Acevedo Lainez
 Ernestina Pais as Laura Viviani
 Vivian El Jaber as Martita Cano
 Esteban Meloni as José María Uriburu
 Mauricio Lavaselli as Manu
 Carla Moure as Brenda
 Sol Jaite as Lucía
 Mariana Chaud as Edith
 Emme as Flor
 Mónica Gonzaga as Fini
 Marcelo De Bellis as Oscar
 Edda Díaz as Norma
 Damián Dreizik as Warner
 Gabo Correa as Fiscal
 Alejandra Flechner as María Esther
 Oscar Ferrigno as Oficial
 Juan Ignacio Machado as Angelito

Special Participation
 Charly García
 Alejandro Lerner
 Sandra Mihanovich
 Hilda Lizarazu
 Bersuit Vergarabat
 Kapanga
 Fito Páez
 Los Tipitos
 Adrián Barilari
 Sergio Denis
 Valeria Mazza
 Marky Ramone
 Gustavo Cordera
 David Lebón
 Leo García
 Pablo Ruiz
 Pablo Echarri
 Palito Ortega
 Nancy Dupláa
 Nito Mestre
 Celeste Carballo
 Fabiana Cantilo
 Ciro Pertusi
 Marta Minujín
 Marcelo Moura
 Sebastián Wainraic
 Iván Noble
 Juanse
 Pía Shaw 
 Elizabeth Vernaci
 Matías Martin
 Jóvenes Pordioseros
 Toti Iglesias
 Martin Fabio
 Viuda e Hijas de Roque Enroll
 Claudia Ruffinatti
 Claudia Mabel Sinesi
 Mavi Díaz
 Juan di Natale
 Rosario Ortega
 Nequi Galotti
 Bebe Sanzo
 Mabby Autino
 Benito Fernández
 Solange Cubillo
 Chano Moreno Charpentier
 Roxana Zarecki
 Débora Bello
 Daniel Agostini
 Leo Veterale
 Ezequiel Cwirkaluk
 Julieta Fazzari
 Nancy Anka
 Gabriela Allegue
 Teté Coustarot
 Ella Es tan Cargosa
 Victoria Saravia
 Jauría

References

External links

 Official site 
 TV Tropes

2010s Argentine television series
2014 telenovelas
Television series set in the 1990s
Telefe telenovelas
Spanish-language telenovelas
Television series about radio
Argentine LGBT-related television shows
2014 Argentine television series debuts
2015 Argentine television series endings
Television shows set in Buenos Aires
Same-sex marriage in television